The Women's Hammer Throw event at the 2007 World Championships in Athletics took place on August 28, 2007 (qualification) and August 30, 2007 (final) at the Nagai Stadium in Osaka, Japan. The qualification standard was set at 71.00 metres.

Medalists

Schedule
All times are Japan Standard Time (UTC+9)

Abbreviations
All results shown are in metres

Records

Qualification

Group A

Group B

Final

See also
2007 in hammer throw

References
Official results, qualification - IAAF.org
Official results, final - IAAF.org
Event report - IAAF.org
 hammerthrow.wz
 todor66

Hammer throw
Hammer throw at the World Athletics Championships
2007 in women's athletics